Hans Joachim Wiemken (born 22 May 1926) was a German rower. He competed in the men's coxed four event at the 1952 Summer Olympics.

References

External links
 

1926 births
Possibly living people
German male rowers
Olympic rowers of Germany
Rowers at the 1952 Summer Olympics
Sportspeople from Hanover